The following properties are listed on the National Register of Historic Places in Hudson County, New Jersey

This is intended to be a complete list of properties and districts listed on the National Register of Historic Places in Hudson County, New Jersey.  The locations of National Register properties and districts (at least for all showing latitude and longitude coordinates below) may be seen in an online map by clicking on "Map of all coordinates". The steam yacht Kestrel, originally listed in Hudson, has subsequently been moved to Upstate New York, while the ferry Yankee, originally listed in New York City was moored in Hoboken for a time; it is now moored in Brooklyn.

|}

Former listing

|}

See also

National Register of Historic Places listings in New Jersey
List of National Historic Landmarks in New Jersey
Standard Oil Company No. 16 (harbor tug), located at Liberty State Park

References

Hudson

Geography of Hudson County, New Jersey
Tourist attractions in Hudson County, New Jersey